KCLK (1430 AM) is a radio station broadcasting a sports format, exclusively with Fox Sports Radio programming. Located near Asotin, Washington, United States, the station serves Lewiston, Clarkston, Asotin, Pullman, Moscow and surrounding areas.  KCLK is currently owned by Pacific Empire Radio Corporation.

External links

FCC History Cards for KCLK

CLK (AM)
Sports radio stations in the United States
Radio stations established in 1971
1971 establishments in Washington (state)